The DFS Habicht (German: "Hawk") is an unlimited aerobatic sailplane that was designed in 1936 by Hans Jacobs with support provided by the Deutsche Forschungsanstalt für Segelflug. Four planes were made available for the Olympic Games of 1936, where the maneuvers of the Habicht over and literally inside the Olympic stadium enthralled spectators.

The flight qualities of the Habicht were praised by pilots, including Hanna Reitsch. It participated in many airshows abroad before the war, including the 1938 National Air Races in Cleveland, Ohio.

Modified versions of the Habicht, dubbed the Stummel-Habicht ("Stumpy Hawk"), were used to train pilots to fly the Messerschmitt Me 163 Komet rocket-powered fighter. Trainees included students from the Hitler Youth Glider Schools. Trainees therefore began on a Stummel-Habicht, in which the original  wingspan, was modified to one having an  wingspan, and another having an  wingspan. The shorter wingspan closely mimicked the ME 163 handling characteristics.

Few Habichts survived World War II. There is one craft, flown by famous French aerobatic pilot Marcel Doret, in the Musée de l'Air et de l'Espace in Paris. Another, with the registration D-8002, flew in Southern Germany until it was destroyed by the collapse of the hangar wherein it was stored. Apart from these original examples, Türk Hava Kurumu manufactured six reverse-engineered copies of the Habicht as the THK-3 in 1945-1946.

After lengthy and patient research to recover the design documentation, Josef Kurz and other members of the Oldtimer Segelflugclub Wasserkuppe built an all-new Habicht. After an extended exhibition career, this exemplar, registered also as D-8002, flies from the Wasserkuppe club's airfield.

Another airworthy Habicht was built by the Zahn family and first flew in 2001. Since then, at the hands of pilot Christoph Zahn, it has provided aerobatics demonstrations at numerous air shows.

Operators

Austrian Air Force (1927–1938)

Specifications

References

External links

OSC Wasserkuppe
DFS Habicht D-1901

1930s German sailplanes
Habicht
Glider aircraft
Gull-wing aircraft
Aircraft first flown in 1936